The Peter Chandler House is a historic house located at 5897 Main Street in Mexico, Oswego County, New York.

Description and history 
It is a formal, two-story, Greek Revival/Exotic Revival style residence constructed of grey sandstone. The residence was built in 1838 and is five bays in width with a symmetrically composed facade and one chimney piercing its roof.

It was listed on the National Register of Historic Places on November 14, 1991.

References

Houses on the National Register of Historic Places in New York (state)
Houses completed in 1838
Houses in Oswego County, New York
National Register of Historic Places in Oswego County, New York